Brigham is a village in the Allerdale borough of Cumbria, England. The village is near to the town of Cockermouth and is located just outside the Lake District National Park.

History
Brigham has existed as a settlement since Neolithic times and an early centre of Christianity in Cumbria. The church of St Bridget's, was originally a Norman building, and is situated at the far north of the village, known as Low Brigham; it contains several fragments of pre-Norman crosses and other early carved stones.  A disused quarry hosting businesses and a caravan holiday park is situated in the centre of the village, above which runs the main street (C2007) of High Brigham.  The quarry is bisected by the non-pavemented road called Stang Lonning.

Until the closure of the Cockermouth and Workington Railway in 1966, Brigham had a railway station. At one time there was also a second station serving the hamlet of Broughton Cross, 1 km west of the main village.

The village gave its name to HMS Brigham, a Ham class minesweeper.  The ship's bell from this vessel is now in St Bridget's Church of England primary school in the village.  Until a more modern fire alarm system was installed, this bell was rung as the fire alarm for the school.

The family of Bounty mutineer Fletcher Christian are buried in the graveyard at St. Bridget's. Fletcher himself, born 1764 and raised in the township of Eaglesfield within Brigham parish (at that time), and christened at St. Bridget's, is thought to be buried on Pitcairn Island, though some have claimed that he returned secretly to England.

Community
The village has its own Church of England primary school; St. Bridget's, with just over 100 pupils. There is no longer a Post Office in Brigham, nor a grocery shop although there is still a social club. Brigham used to have 3 local pubs all of which have been converted into houses. They were The Appletree Inn (by the War Memorial Hall and Cuddy Croft Quarry), The Limekiln and The Wheatsheaf, both on Low Road. Housing estates known as High Rigg and The Hill are at the east and west ends of the village, with newer estates St. Bridget's and Butterfields Close in the north and south respectively. The Brigham War Memorial Hall was opened on 20 November 1924 (OS grid reference: NY 08501 30274).

Etymology
'Brigham' is 'homestead near the bridge'. 'Brycg' is OE (Old English) for 'bridge'; 'hām' is OE for 'village', 'homestead'.

Governance

Brigham is part of the Workington constituency for UK parliament. The current Member of Parliament for the Workington constituency is Mark Jenkinson, who is a member of the Conservative Party (UK). The Labour Party having lost the seat in the constituency at the General Election of December 2019.

For Local Government purposes it's in the Broughton St Bridget's Ward of Allerdale Borough Council. This ward stretches north to Bridekirk with a total population at the 2011 Census of 4,178.

Brigham is part of the Cockermouth South Division of Cumbria County Council.

The village has its own parish council, Brigham Parish Council which also represents the adjacent hamlet of Broughton Cross to the west.

See also

Listed buildings in Brigham, Cumbria

References

Further reading
David Bradbury (compiler), "Pages From Brigham's History" Whitehaven, Past Presented (2008)

External links
  Cumbria County History Trust: Brigham (nb: provisional research only - see Talk page)

Villages in Cumbria
Allerdale
Civil parishes in Cumbria